Phlegethontioidea is a clade of aistopod amphibians including the families Phlegethontiidae and Pseudophlegethontiidae. It is a stem-based taxon defined in phylogenetic terms as all aistopods sharing a more recent common ancestor with Phlegethontia than Oestocephalus.

References

Carboniferous amphibians
Permian amphibians
Aistopods